The 1975–76 English Hockey League season took place from September 1975 until April 1976.

The Men's Cup was won by Nottingham.

The Men's National Inter League Championship brought together the winners of their respective regional leagues. The championship (held in September 1976) was won by Slough.

As from the 1980-81 season the National Inter League Championship would be held in the spring of the same season instead of the Autumn of the following season.

Men's Courage National Inter League Championship 
(Held at Aston University Grounds, Birmingham & September 11–12)

Group A

Group B

Final 

Slough
D Jackson, John Brindley, Mike Parris, Andy Churcher, John Allen, Sutinder Singh Khehar, R Napier, John Murdock, Stuart Collins, Balwant Saini, Masood Ahmad
Bury St Edmunds
M Sturgeon (D Aldous sub), H Waters, G Brown (A Harvey sub), J Grinham, S Jamieson, M Francis, G Waters, S R L Long, G Randle, L Turner, C Upson

Men's Cup (Benson & Hedges National Clubs Championship)

Quarter-finals

Semi-finals

Final 
(Held at Church Meadow, Hounslow, on 25 April)

Nottingham
Boddington, Watson, Gill, Elson, Harvey, Appelby, Walters, Maughan, Cassell, Sharpe, Stokes
Hounslow
Graham Brightwell, Mike Featherstone, Glen Evans, Ian Thompson, Peter Badger, Watts, Bill Smith (David Barker sub), Brookeman, Watson, Ian Barrett, Chris Langhorne, Harvinder Sibia

References 

1975
field hockey
field hockey
1975 in field hockey
1976 in field hockey